McLenaghen is a surname. Notable people with the surname include:

James McLenaghen (1891–1950), Canadian politician
Mike McLenaghen (born 1954), Canadian soccer player

See also
McLenaghan